A number of video games were selected by the Museum of Modern Art, located in New York City, as part of its permanent collection. These games were chosen by the Museum of Modern Art in order to showcase design elements within them. Fourteen initial games were announced in November 2012, with plans to expand the collection to up to forty games over time, as the museum is able to acquire the display rights for them. Six more games were added to the collection in June 2013, as well a game console.

Curated by Paola Antonelli, the collection was included in the exhibition Applied Design  in the Philip Johnson Architecture and Design Galleries. In these galleries, around a hundred objects that represent contemporary design were displayed. Most games in the collection are playable on some level and all are displayed in a manner to minimize the influence of nostalgia.

Background

The exhibition stirred up controversy, as some critics argued video games are not considered art and therefore might not have a place in an art gallery. However, the collection is modeled after Philip Johnson’s 1934 exhibition "Machine Art," in which pieces of machinery such as propeller blades were displayed in a minimalist fashion to lay focus on their mechanical design. This set-up would create a "strange distance, this shock, that made people realize how gorgeous formally, and also important functionally, design pieces were," which, according to the exhibit's curator Paola Antonelli, is the desired effect of the exhibition. In order to minimize factors such as nostalgia, the games are displayed in a minimalist fashion where only a screen and controlling-device are visible on an otherwise blank wall.

At least one other video game, namely Katamari Damacy, has been displayed in MoMA's design galleries before. The exhibition is part of a movement to include forms beyond traditional media that the Museum of Modern Art began in 2006, starting with digital fonts and later moving on to video games. MoMA has taken cautious care of traffic flow, as this had proved to be an "interesting" challenge. Games that are likely to be heavily played, such as Pac-Man, have been placed near entrances and exits to assure a constant flow from these games, while games that would require a larger amount of time to play have had a demo version developed for them, so that visitors can beat those and move on.

Though the MoMA is mainly interested in acquiring a game's hardware and interface, the proprietary source code is considered the most valued. According to Antonelli, "when we cannot acquire the code, we acquire simulations, emulations, the cartridge, the hardware. But what we're interested in showing is the interaction by itself."

The collection leans towards the classic era of arcade machines and 8-bit consoles as, during this era, "a small number of visionaries laid the groundwork for where we are now." According to Paul Galloway, many early, "seemingly simple games remain as vital and compelling today as they were" during the 1970s and 80s. Ralph H. Baer's Magnavox Odyssey console was added as it was considered both "a masterpiece of engineering and industrial design" as well as highly important during the birth of the video game industry.

Collection
The wave indicates when a game was added to the collection; wave 1 was included on November 29, 2012, and wave 2 was included on June 23, 2013. Street Fighter II was added in November, 2013, and Snake was added in October, 2015.

See also

List of works in the Museum of Modern Art
List of video games considered the best
Video games as an art form

References

External links
 Applied Design exhibit information at MoMA
 A Collection of Ideas exhibit information at MoMA

Video games
Museum of Modern Art
Museum of Modern Art